The AFC Championship Game is the annual championship game of the American Football Conference (AFC) and one of the two semifinal playoff games of the National Football League (NFL), the largest professional American football league in the world. The game is played on the last Sunday in January by the two remaining playoff teams, following the AFC postseason's first two rounds. The AFC champion then advances to face the winner of the NFC Championship Game in the Super Bowl.

The game was established as part of the 1970 merger between the NFL and the American Football League (AFL), with the merged league realigning into two conferences. Since 1984, each winner of the AFC Championship Game has also received the Lamar Hunt Trophy, named after the founder of both the AFL and the Kansas City Chiefs, Lamar Hunt.

History
The first AFC Championship Game was played following the 1970 regular season after the merger between the NFL and the American Football League. The game is considered the successor to the former AFL Championship, and its game results are listed with that of its predecessor in the annual NFL Record and Fact Book. Since the pre-merger NFL consisted of six more teams than the AFL (16 teams for the NFL and 10 for the AFL), a realignment was required as part of the merger to create two conferences with an equal number of teams: The NFL's Baltimore Colts, the Cleveland Browns, and the Pittsburgh Steelers joined the ten former AFL teams to form the AFC; while the remaining 13 pre-merger NFL clubs formed the NFC.

Every current AFC team except the Houston Texans has played in an AFC Championship Game at least once. The Seattle Seahawks, who have been members in both the AFC and the NFC, hold the distinction of appearing in both conference title games, a loss in the AFC conference title game to the Los Angeles Raiders for Super Bowl XVIII and, in their first appearance in a NFC conference title game, a win over the Carolina Panthers for Super Bowl XL. The Pittsburgh Steelers have the most appearances in the AFC Championship Game at 16, with 11 of those games being in Pittsburgh, the most for either conference. The New England Patriots have won the most AFC Championships at 11, and played in a record eight straight AFC title games (2011–2018). At least one of Tom Brady and Ben Roethlisberger played in every championship game between the 2003 and the 2018 seasons, except for the 2009 season.

The Denver Broncos and the Pittsburgh Steelers are the only two AFC teams to appear in at least one AFC Championship game in every decade since 1970.

Playoff structure

The structure of the NFL playoffs has changed several times since 1970. At the end of each regular season, the top teams in the AFC qualify for the postseason, including all division champions (three division winners from the 1970–71 to 2001–02 seasons; four since the 2002–03 season) and a set number of "wild card" teams that possess the two best win–loss records after the regular season yet fail to win their division (one wild card team from the 1970–71 to 1977–78 seasons; two wild cards from 1978–79 to 1989–90, and from 2002–03 to 2019–20; three from 1990–91 to 2001–02, and since 2020–21). The two teams remaining following the Wild Card round (first round) and the divisional round (second round) play in the AFC Championship Game, with the winner advancing to the Super Bowl.

Initially, the site of the AFC Championship Game was determined on a rotating basis. Since the 1975–76 season, the site of the game has been based on playoff seeding based on the regular season won-loss record, with the highest surviving seed hosting the game. A wild card team can only host the game if both participants are wild cards; such an instance has yet to occur in the NFL.

For the 2022–23 season, NFL owners passed a temporary modification to accommodate for a Buffalo Bills–Cincinnati Bengals regular season game that was eventually canceled after Buffalo safety Damar Hamlin suffered cardiac arrest in the first quarter of that contest.  The league decided neither to resume nor replay the game, and therefore both Buffalo and Cincinnati finished the regular season with one less game than the other NFL teams. Because both the Bills and the Kansas City Chiefs ended with the same number of regular season losses, it was decided that a Buffalo–Kansas City AFC Championship Game would be played at a neutral site, Mercedes-Benz Stadium in Atlanta, if both teams advanced that far. This never came to fruition, as the Bengals defeated the Bills in the divisional round.

Lamar Hunt Trophy

Beginning with the 1984–85 NFL playoffs, the winner of the AFC Championship Game has received the Lamar Hunt Trophy, named after the founder of the AFL. The original trophy consisted of a wooden base with a sculpted AFC logo in the front and a sculpture of various football players in the back.

For the 2010–11 NFL playoffs, the Lamar Hunt Trophy and the George Halas Trophy, which is awarded to the NFC Champion, were redesigned by Tiffany & Co. at the request of the NFL, in an attempt to make both awards more significant. The trophies are now a new, silver design with the outline of a hollow football positioned on a small base to more closely resemble the Vince Lombardi Trophy, which is awarded to the winner of the Super Bowl.

In recent years Conference championship rings are also awarded to members of the team who wins the AFC or NFC championship since they are the winners of the conference, even though they may not necessarily follow it up with a win in the Super Bowl.

List of AFC Championship Games
Numbers in parentheses in the table are AFC Championships. Bold indicates team won Super Bowl that year.
Numbers in parentheses in the city and stadium column is the number of times that metropolitan area and stadium has hosted an AFC Championship, respectively.

Appearances, 1970–present

Appearances by year
In the sortable table below, teams are ordered first by number of appearances, then by number of wins, and finally by year of first appearance. In the "Season(s)" column, bold years indicate winning Conference Championship appearances.

Most common matchups

Records

 Most victories: 11**; New England Patriots (1985, 1996, 2001, 2003, 2004, 2007, 2011, 2014, 2016, 2017, 2018)
 Most losses: 8; Pittsburgh Steelers, (1972, 1976, 1984, 1994, 1997, 2001, 2004, 2016)
 Most appearances: 16; Pittsburgh Steelers (1972, 1974–1976, 1978, 1979, 1984, 1994, 1995, 1997, 2001, 2004, 2005, 2008, 2010, 2016)
 Most consecutive appearances: 8**; New England Patriots (2011–2018)
 Most consecutive victories: 4**; Buffalo Bills (1990–1993)
 Most appearances without a win: 4; New York Jets (1982, 1998, 2009, 2010)
 Most consecutive losses without a win: 4; (tie) Oakland Raiders (1970, 1973, 1974, 1975)
 Most shutouts: 2**; Miami Dolphins (1971, 21–0 vs Colts and 1982, 14–0 vs Jets)
 Most consecutive losses: 3; Oakland Raiders (1973–1975) 
 Most games hosted: 11**; Pittsburgh Steelers (1972, 1975, 1978, 1979, 1994, 1995, 1997, 2001, 2004, 2008, 2010)
 Most consecutive games hosted: 5**; Kansas City Chiefs (2018–2022)
 Most numerous matchups: 3 (tie)
 Pittsburgh Steelers vs. Oakland Raiders (1974, 1975, 1976)
 Cleveland Browns vs. Denver Broncos (1986, 1987, 1989)
 New England Patriots vs. Pittsburgh Steelers (2001, 2004, 2016)
 New England Patriots vs. Indianapolis Colts (2003, 2006, 2014)
 Most points scored: 51**; January 20, 1991 (1990) – Buffalo Bills (51) vs. Los Angeles Raiders (3)
 Largest margin of victory: 48 points**; January 20, 1991 (1990) – Buffalo Bills (51) vs. Los Angeles Raiders (3)
 Fewest points scored, winning team: 10; January 12, 1992 (1991) – Buffalo Bills (10) vs. Denver Broncos (7) 
 Fewest points scored: 0*; (tie) Jan 2, 1972 (1971) Baltimore Colts 0 vs Dolphins 21, Jan 23, 1983 (1982) NY Jets (0) vs Dolphins (14)
 Most points scored, losing team: 34**; January 21, 2007 (2006) – New England Patriots (34) vs. Indianapolis Colts (38) 
 Most combined points scored: 73**; January 6, 1985 (1984) – Miami Dolphins (45) vs. Pittsburgh Steelers (28)
 Fewest combined points scored: 14; January 23, 1983 (1982) – Miami Dolphins (14) vs. New York Jets (0)
 Current AFC teams which have never appeared in a Conference Championship Game: Houston Texans
 Current AFC teams which have never hosted a Conference Championship Game: Baltimore Ravens, Houston Texans, New York Jets, Tennessee Titans
 Current AFC teams which have never won a Conference Championship: Cleveland Browns (0–3), Houston Texans (0–0), Jacksonville Jaguars (0–3) and New York Jets (0–4)
 Longest drought without appearing in an AFC Championship Game: 32 years; Cleveland Browns (last appearance – 1989)
 Longest drought without an AFC Championship: 50 years**: New York Jets
 Highest attendance: 91,445; Los Angeles Raiders vs. Seattle Seahawks in Los Angeles on January 8, 1984 (1983)
 Overtime games:
1986 Denver Broncos 23 Cleveland Browns 20
2018 New England Patriots 37 Kansas City Chiefs 31
2021 Cincinnati Bengals 27 Kansas City Chiefs 24

Notes:
 *Tied for Conference Championship record
 **Conference Championship record

TV ratings
1982: 51.6 million viewers
2003: 41.5 million
2005: 44.3 million
2006: 39 million viewers
2007: 46.7 million viewers
2009: 42 million viewers
2010: 42.352 million viewers
2011: 54.9 million viewers
2012: 48.7 million viewers
2013: 47.7 million viewers
2014: 51.3 million viewers
2015: 42.1 million viewers
2016: 53.3 million viewers
2017: 41.2 million viewers
2018: 53.9 million viewers
2019: 41.1 million viewers
2020: 41.85 million viewers
2021: 47.85 million viewers
2022: 53.12 million viewers

Footnotes

References

 
Recurring sporting events established in 1971